The Cannon and Ball Show was a successful comedy variety show on ITV featuring the double act comprising Tommy Cannon and Bobby Ball.

The pair were booked to perform on seven episodes of Bruce Forsyth's Big Night, but not all of their segments were screened, as producers were trying to shore up ratings and decided to give Forsyth more air time instead.  During this time, LWT's then director of programmes Michael Grade watched the dropped clips and decided to give the pair their own television series.

Cannon & Ball's first regular television series was filmed by LWT and lasted nine years, until December 1988.

After the series ended, the pair went on to Cannon and Ball's Casino, a Saturday-night game show for Yorkshire Television in 1990, and Plaza Patrol, also for Yorkshire Television.

Transmission details
 Series One: 6 episodes: 28 July & 4 Aug 1979; 26 Oct – 16 Nov 1979
 Series Two: 7 episodes: 11 April – 23 May 1980
 Series Three: 6 episodes: 25 April – 30 May 1981
 Series Four: 6 episodes: 8 May-12 June 1982
 Series Five: 6 episodes: 3 Dec 1983 – 21 Jan 1984
 Series Six: 6 episodes: 13 October – 17 Nov 1984
 Series Seven: 6 episodes 26 April – 31 May 1986
 Series Eight: 6 episodes 10 January – 14 Feb 1987
 Series Nine: 6 episodes: 28 May – 2 July 1988

Specials
 Christmas Special: Saturday 20 December 1980
 Cannon and Ball at Drury Lane: Saturday 2 January 1982
 Easter Special: Saturday 2 April 1983
 Christmas Cannon and Ball: Saturday 21 December 1985
 Christmas Special Saturday 27 December 1986
 The Cannon and Ball Show Special – 2 Jan 1988
 Christmas Special: Saturday 24 December 1988  (This special was made by Yorkshire Television)

References

External links

Ftvdb.bfi.org.uk
Ftvdb.bfi.org.uk

1979 British television series debuts
1988 British television series endings
1970s British television sketch shows
1980s British comedy television series
ITV comedy
London Weekend Television shows
Television series by ITV Studios